Piletocera exuvialis is a moth in the family Crambidae. It was described by Snellen in 1890. It is found in India (Sikkim).

References

exuvialis
Endemic fauna of India
Moths of Asia
Moths described in 1890